Ricky S. Moore (born April 10, 1976) is an American former basketball player and current coach.  He previously served as an assistant at the University of Connecticut (UConn).  He played professionally for eleven years.

Moore came to UConn after an All-American high school career at Westside High School in Augusta, Georgia.  He was a three-time co-captain for the Huskies, including the school's first national championship team in 1998–99.  That year, Moore averaged 6.8 points and 3.6 assists per game. In the 1999 National Championship game, Moore's defense on Duke's William Avery, and his ability to guard Trajan Langdon in the final seconds, was seen as one of the keys to the Huskies defeat of the heavily favored Blue Devils and Moore was named to the All-Final Four team.

After graduation, Moore played professionally in the United States, Austria, Ukraine, Sweden, Turkey, and Germany over eleven seasons.

In 2010, Moore retired as a player and joined the coaching staff at Dartmouth College as an assistant.  In 2012, he left for an opening as an administrative assistant at his alma mater, UConn, working for fellow Husky alum Kevin Ollie. In 2013, he was promoted to a full assistant role and helped lead the Huskies to the 2013–14 National Championship. Moore stayed at UConn until 2018, when head coach Ollie was dismissed because of an NCAA investigation.

He then coached in AAU. In June 2021, Moore was named head boys' basketball coach at Northwest Carrabus High School in Kannapolis, North Carolina.

References

External links
G-League stats

1976 births
Living people
American expatriate basketball people in Austria
American expatriate basketball people in Germany
American expatriate basketball people in Sweden
American expatriate basketball people in Turkey
American expatriate basketball people in Ukraine
American men's basketball coaches
American men's basketball players
Basketball coaches from Georgia (U.S. state)
Basketball players from Augusta, Georgia
Beşiktaş men's basketball players
Connecticut Pride players
Dartmouth Big Green men's basketball coaches
Parade High School All-Americans (boys' basketball)
Point guards
Roanoke Dazzle players
Shooting guards
Sioux Falls Skyforce (CBA) players
UConn Huskies men's basketball coaches
UConn Huskies men's basketball players